Jace Andrew Jung (born October 4, 2000) is an American baseball second baseman in the Detroit Tigers organization. He played college baseball for the Texas Tech Red Raiders.

Early life and amateur career
Jung grew up in San Antonio, Texas and attended Douglas MacArthur High School.

Jung enrolled at Texas Tech University to play college baseball for the Texas Tech Red Raiders. Jung batted .264 through 19 games games of his true freshman season before it was cut short due to the coronavirus pandemic. As a redshirt freshman, Jung and was named the Big 12 Conference Baseball Player of the Year after batting for a .337 average with 21 home runs and 67 RBIs. During the summer of 2021, he played for the Orleans Firebirds of the Cape Cod Baseball League. Jung was named the preseason Big 12 Player of the Year going into his redshirt sophomore season.

Professional career
The Detroit Tigers selected Jung in the first round, with the 12th overall selection, of the 2022 Major League Baseball draft. He signed with the team on July 25, 2022, and received a $4,590,300 signing bonus.

Personal life
Jung's older brother, Josh Jung, also played baseball at Texas Tech and was selected by the Texas Rangers in the first round of the 2019 MLB draft.

References

External links

Texas Tech Red Raiders bio

2000 births
Living people
Baseball second basemen
Texas Tech Red Raiders baseball players
Baseball players from Texas
Orleans Firebirds players
 West Michigan Whitecaps players